Anti-slip steel grating (also known as slip-resistant grating) is a type of  bar grating designed to prevent slippage. Steel bar grating is manufactured in a variety of methods. Welded bar grating consists of load bars electrically fuse welded to cross bars. Pressure-locked bar grating, or swaged grating, is where steel rods are forced through and locked in load bars. Riveted bar grating is where the load bars are riveted to the cross bars. There are wide varieties of trade names for each type manufactured.

Perforated sheet metal types:
 Diamond-shaped serrated perforated sheet metal. Examples of trade names are Grip Strut, Diamond Grip, Ry, Diamond, Grip Span, Deck Span, Grip Track. 
 Round hole perforated sheet metal. Examples of trade names are Perf-o-grip, Safety-grip, Shur Grip, Ry-Grip, Open Grip and Grate Lock. 
 Raised dimple perforated sheet metal. Examples of trade names are Traction Tread, Safety Tread, Shur Step, Ry-Tread and Tread Grip.

The excellent self-cleaning characteristics of plain surface grating make it suitable for the majority of applications. In the presence of fluids or materials that could cause the top surface of the grating to become wet or slippery, specification of the optional serrated surface should be considered. When serrated grating is specified, the bearing bar depth must be 1/4 inch greater than the sizes shown on the load tables to provide the equivalent strength of non-serrated gratings.

Pedestrian infrastructure